Dravidogecko smithi, also known as Smith's dravidogecko, is a species of gecko found in India. It is assigned to the genus Dravidogecko.

References

Dravidogecko
Reptiles described in 2019